Jessie Maude "Chubbie" Miller (1902 – 1972, London, England) was a pioneering Australian aviator.

England to Australia
In 1927 while visiting London from her native Australia, Miller met, helped finance, and flew with R.A.F. officer Bill Lancaster in his Avro Avian Red Rose, on an attempt to set a long distance flying record from England to Australia. At the time it was one of the longest flights made in such a small aircraft, although they were overtaken en route by Bert Hinkler in another Avian. Bad weather forced them down in Sumatra, but they continued on, and after 159 days she finally arrived as the first woman to complete an England-to-Australia flight. Although 24 hours late, a huge crowd greeted them on arrival in Darwin, and on their subsequent tour around Australia.

In 1928 Lancaster and Miller moved to the United States on the promise of a Hollywood movie which was never made. Miller became an aviator in her own right, competing in the famous "Powder Puff Derby" of 1929.

Three years after Miller's pioneering flight, the first solo England – Australia flight by a woman was made in 1930 by Amy Johnson.

Clarke murder
In 1932, Lancaster was in Mexico looking for work. At the same time, Haden Clarke, a male American writer, was living in Lancaster and Miller's Florida home in order to assist Miller in writing her autobiography. Clarke and Miller developed a relationship in Lancaster's absence, and Clarke convinced Miller to leave Lancaster and marry him instead. Upon receipt of this news, Lancaster returned promptly to Florida.

On 20 April, Clarke was killed by a gunshot wound to the head. Despite the facts that the gun was Lancaster's, and that he admitted forging suicide notes found at the scene (one addressed to Lancaster and another to Miller), Lancaster was acquitted of murder.

Popular culture
Verdict on a Lost Flyer, a book on Bill Lancaster by Ralph Barker, was published by Harrap, London, in 1969.

The Fabulous Flying Mrs Miller: An Australian's true story of adventure, danger, romance and murder, by Carol Baxter, was published by Allen & Unwin, Sydney, in 2017.

The Lost Pilots, The spectacular rise and scandalous fall of aviation's golden couple, a book on Miller and Bill Lancaster by Corey Mead, was published by Macmillan, London in 2018.

A TV miniseries called The Lancaster Miller Affair was made in Australia in 1985, wherein Miller was portrayed by actress Kerry Mack.

References

1902 births
1972 deaths
Australian aviators
American aviators
Australian emigrants to the United States